Atli Stefán Einarsson (born 20 October 1966) is an Icelandic former footballer who played as an attacking midfielder. He won four caps for the Iceland national football team between 1990 and 1992. He won the Icelandic championship in 1991 as a member of Víkingur Reykjavík.

Personal life
Atli's father, Einar Valur Kristjánsson, was an alpine skier who competed in two events at the 1956 Winter Olympics. He also played football for ÍBÍ and Víkingur Reykjavík.

Honours

Icelandic Championships: 1
1991,

See also
List of Iceland international footballers

References

External links

1966 births
Living people
Atli Einarsson
Atli Einarsson
Atli Einarsson
Atli Einarsson
Atli Einarsson
Atli Einarsson
Atli Einarsson
TuRU Düsseldorf players
Atli Einarsson